Frederick Garfield Gilmore (May 22, 1887 – March 17, 1969) was an American featherweight professional boxer who competed in the early twentieth century. He won a bronze medal in Boxing at the 1904 Summer Olympics, losing to Frank Haller in the semi-final.

Biography
Gilmore was born in Montreal, Quebec, Canada. He lived at least part of his life in Cook County, Illinois with his wife, Lempi Riippa. He died in Los Angeles, California.

References

External links
 
 
 
 

1887 births
1969 deaths
Featherweight boxers
Olympic bronze medalists for the United States in boxing
Boxers at the 1904 Summer Olympics
Boxers from Montreal
Anglophone Quebec people
Canadian emigrants to the United States
Canadian male boxers
American male boxers
Boxers from Illinois
Medalists at the 1904 Summer Olympics